Orlando Peralta (born 8 February 1930) is an Argentine former basketball player.

References

1930 births
Living people
Argentine men's basketball players
1959 FIBA World Championship players
Basketball players at the 1951 Pan American Games
Basketball players at the 1955 Pan American Games
Pan American Games silver medalists for Argentina
Pan American Games medalists in basketball
Medalists at the 1951 Pan American Games
Medalists at the 1955 Pan American Games